A headless Content Management System, or headless CMS, is a back end-only web content management system that acts primarily as a content repository. A headless CMS makes content accessible via an API for display on any device, without a built-in front end or presentation layer. The term 'headless' comes from the concept of chopping the 'head' (the front end) off the 'body' (the back end). 

Whereas a traditional CMS typically combines a website's content and presentation layers, a headless CMS comprises the content component and focuses on the administrative interface for content creators, the facilitation of content workflows and collaboration, and the organization of content into taxonomies. A headless CMS must be combined with a separate presentation layer to handle design, site structure, and templates. That combination generally relies on stateless or loosely coupled APIs.

One advantage of this decoupled approach is that content can be sent via APIs to multiple display types, like mobile and Internet of things (IoT) devices, alongside a website. A disadvantage, however, is that maintaining two separate systems for a single site can require more resources.

Cloud-first headless CMSes are those that were also built with a multi-tenant cloud model at their core and whose vendors promote software as a service (SaaS). These vendors promise high availability, scalability, and full management of security, upgrades, and hotfixes on behalf of clients. Headless commerce uses the same setup to separate back end product management and navigation from the front end of a website or other display types (e.g. IoT). This is similar to how headless CMSes focus on creating content in the back end to be displayed on front ends via APIs.

Headless CMS is similar to but distinct from the use of widgets or plugins on a site, like adding an online ordering and delivery plugin to a restaurant website.

Common features 
Most headless CMS platforms employ a version of these features:
 GraphQL API
 Query and Mutations API
 RESTful API
 Microservices architecture
 Multi-channel publishing
 SDKs and CLIs
 Editor interface
 Workflows
 Versioning
 Roles and permissions
 Content modelling
 Asset library
 Content types and taxonomy
 Localization
 Visitor segmentation
 Personalization

Coupled CMS vs. Headless CMS 
Most monolithic content management systems are 'coupled', meaning that the content management application (CMA) and the content delivery application (CDA) come together in a single application. This makes back-end user tools, content editing and taxonomy, website design, and templates inseparable. Coupled systems are helpful for blogs and basic websites, as everything can be managed in one place. Conversely, in a coupled CMS, CMS platform code is tightly connected to any custom code and templates, so developers have to spend more time on installations, customizations, upgrades, hot fixes, and more. They cannot easily move their code to another CMS.

Traditional content management systems are often seen as the easiest and most cost-effective way of creating dynamic websites. Popular templates and themes make it straightforward to carry out basic website design, while freelance developers offer a range of affordable support. The traditional approach also appeals to those looking for a DIY solution, as it is relatively easy to learn how to manage and design a website using a traditional CMS.

Decoupled CMS 
The difference between a decoupled CMS and headless CMS is based on the inclusion of the front end in the offering: Decoupled CMS would always have a front end included in the offering though connected with an API, hence following the decoupled architecture, whereas a headless CMS does not offer the front end at all but an API using which content is served. 

In response to the introduction of headless CMSes, many traditional CMS vendors have implemented APIs on their systems, promoting them as decoupled CMSes. This approach promises website rendering capabilities along with the flexibility of a headless CMS. Yet, the APIs are still based upon a model designed for a singular website, making them somewhat coupled and thus limiting the contexts in which one can effectively use the content. 

A decoupled CMS and a headless one because they have a lot in common as a headless CMS is a type of decoupled architecture. Like a headless CMS, a decoupled CMS separates the CMA and CDA environments, typically with the content created behind the firewall and then synchronized and pushed to the delivery environment. The main difference between a decoupled CMS and a headless CMS is that the decoupled architecture is active: it prepares content for presentation and then pushes it into the delivery environment; whereas a headless CMS is reactive: it sits idly until a request is sent for content. Another core difference is that the decoupled first offer APIs to serve content, while the latter are API-exclusive.

The decoupled architecture allows for easier scalability and provides better security than coupled architecture, but it does not provide the same support for omnichannel delivery. There are multiple environments to manage, hiking up infrastructure and maintenance costs.

Criticisms and disadvantages 

Headless CMS is a content management system (CMS) without a pre-built front-end presentation layer or templating system; instead, it provides a content repository and an API for managing the content. While this allows for greater flexibility and customizability, it can also present challenges or drawbacks for teams and organizations. The main downside is that it may require more effort to set up and configure and a certain level of web development knowledge on both the front and back end.

 They require heavier technical proficiency than their monolithic counterparts.
 Since there's no front-end framework built into the architecture, setting up a headless CMS requires front-end development skills.
 There is sometimes no built-in preview function for unpublished content. Editorial teams highly value this feature.
 Managing multiple systems can be challenging, and a team's knowledge base must cover all of them.
 Due to how customizable headless CMSes are, there are a lot fewer options when it comes to ready-made templates or plug-ins.
 Lack of channel-specific support
 Since pure headless CMSes don’t deal with the presentation layer, developers may have to create some functionality on their own, such as website navigation.
 As pure headless CMSes do not typically provide the concept of pages and web sitemaps, content editors need to adapt to the fact that content is organized in its pure form, independently on the website or other channels.

Potential benefits 

A headless CMS offers a solution to issues arising from the traditional approach by decoupling the front end (the "head") from the back end. This allows the front end to be reworked or changed anytime, and different front ends can consume the same content. Furthermore, the architecture of the CMS is more secure as the content is stored on a separate server from the front-end presentation, which reduces the potential attack surface.

 Omnichannel connectivity for agile marketing
 Improved developer experience
 Reduced attack surface
 Easier to migrate to new technologies
 Faster front ends due to JAMStack and static-site generators
 Increased fault tolerance
 Less infrastructure for developers to maintain
 Increased collaboration between developers and content creators
 Content scalability: write once, deploy anywhere
 Optimization out-of-the-box

See also 

 List of content management systems
 Content management system
 Content management
 Content Management Interface
 Document management system
 Dynamic web page
 Enterprise content management
 HTML
 Agile software development
 Information management
 Knowledge management
 LAMP (software bundle)
 Revision control
 Web application framework
 Personalization management system

References

External links 

Content management systems